The name Hernan has been used for seven tropical cyclones in the Eastern Pacific Ocean.
 Tropical Storm Hernan (1984) - Minimal tropical storm with no effect on land
 Hurricane Hernan (1990) – High-end Category 4 hurricane, didn't affect land
 Hurricane Hernan (1996) – Struck Mexico as a Category 1 hurricane, caused unknown amount of damage
 Hurricane Hernan (2002) – Category 5 hurricane that caused minor effects in Mexico and California
 Hurricane Hernan (2008) – Category 3 hurricane, no land impact
 Hurricane Hernan (2014) – Minimal hurricane with no effect on land
 Tropical Storm Hernan (2020) – Weak storm that brushed Mexico as a tropical depression, causing flooding and mudslides

Pacific hurricane set index articles